The Governorates of Palestine are the administrative divisions of the State of Palestine.
After the signing of the Oslo Accords, the Israeli-occupied West Bank and Gaza Strip were divided into three areas (Area A, Area B, and Area C) and 16 governorates under the jurisdiction of the Palestinian National Authority. Since 2007, there have been two governments claiming to be the legitimate government of the Palestinian National Authority, one based in the West Bank and one based in the Gaza Strip.

List

West Bank

Gaza Strip

See also
 ISO 3166-2:PS
List of regions of Palestine by Human Development Index

References

Palestine, State of
Palestine